Johann Hoffmann (28 March 1857 – 1 November 1919) was a German neurologist born in Hahnheim.

He is remembered for describing Hoffmann's reflex and Werdnig–Hoffmann disease (now spinal muscular atrophy type 1). He was educated at Worms and studied medicine at Heidelberg. He worked under Professor Wilhelm Erb, and succeeded him as head of neurology at Heidelberg.

Hoffmann died in Heidelberg.

References 

1857 births
1919 deaths
People from Mainz-Bingen
People from Rhenish Hesse
German neurologists
Heidelberg University alumni
Academic staff of Heidelberg University
Spinal muscular atrophy